Raymond Arthur Speed (4 July 1914 – 8 July 1997) was a football (soccer) player who represented New Zealand at international level.

Speed made his full All Whites debut in a 1–7 loss to Australia on 4 July 1936  and ended his international playing career with six A-international caps to his credit, his final cap an appearance in a 1–4 loss to South Africa on 19 July 1947.

References

External links
Ray Speed at the New Zealand death index

1914 births
1997 deaths
New Zealand association footballers
New Zealand international footballers

Association footballers not categorized by position